Zombie Girl: The Movie is a 2009 documentary directed by Justin Johnson, Aaron Marshall, and Erik Mauck. The film focuses on the making of the 2006 zombie film Pathogen that was directed by Emily Hagins, who was twelve years-old at the time.

Plot 
The documentary chronicles the making of Emily Hagin's feature-length zombie film Pathogen. The film, which took Hagin two years to complete and screen, was met with several setbacks during its filming due to elements such as theft of property. During the filming of Zombie Girl, the directors noted Hagin's growth as a fledgling director, as she was twelve at the time Pathogen was made.

Cast
 Emily Hagins	
 Megan Hagins
 Jerry Hagins
 C. Robert Cargill
 Tiger Darrow
 Kate Dawson
 Rebecca Elliott
 Alec Herskowitz
 Kirk Hunter
 Rose Kent-McGlew
 Harry Jay Knowles
 Tim League
 Phillip Thomas Martinez
 Jay Giovanni Ramirez
 Neil Reece

Reception
Critical reception for Zombie Girl: The Movie has been mostly positive. On Rotten Tomatoes the film holds a rating of 100% based reviews from 9 critics. 
IndieWire gave a positive review, saying that while they had their doubts about the documentary's running time, "the directors manage to craft an intermittently entertaining chronicle of Hagins's attempts to navigate the usual filmmaking hurdles — in addition to a few unique ones." The documentary also received positive reviews from Fearnet and Film Threat.

Awards
 Spirit of Slamdance Award from the Slamdance Film Festival (2009)

References

External links
 
 
 

2009 films
American documentary films
Documentary films about films
Films shot in Texas
Documentary films about horror
2000s English-language films
2000s American films